Cas M. Robinson (born August 31, 1935) was an American politician in the state of Georgia.

He is an alumnus of the University of Alabama and Louisville Presbyterian Theological Seminary. He worked as a banker. He served in the Georgia House of Representatives from 1977 to 1987. He was then appointed to the Georgia Public Service Commission in 1987 and won the 1988 special election for the seat, but was defeated in the Democratic primary for the seat in 1992.

References

1935 births
Living people
Members of the Georgia House of Representatives
People from Fayette County, Alabama
People from Stone Mountain, Georgia
Georgia Public Service Commission